Jacco Arends (born 28 January 1991) is a Dutch retired badminton player who specializes in doubles. Arends began playing badminton at his hometown club BC Duinwijck, and in 2009, he won European Junior Championships in mixed doubles with Selena Piek. He was the bronze medalist at the 2016 European Championships, and at the same year, he competed at the 2016 Summer Olympics held in Rio de Janeiro, Brazil.

Achievements

European Championships 
Mixed doubles

European Junior Championships 
Mixed doubles

BWF World Tour 
The BWF World Tour, which was announced on 19 March 2017 and implemented in 2018, is a series of elite badminton tournaments sanctioned by the Badminton World Federation (BWF). The BWF World Tour is divided into levels of World Tour Finals, Super 1000, Super 750, Super 500, Super 300, and the BWF Tour Super 100.

Mixed doubles

BWF Grand Prix 
The BWF Grand Prix had two levels, the Grand Prix and Grand Prix Gold. It was a series of badminton tournaments sanctioned by the Badminton World Federation (BWF) and played between 2007 and 2017.

Men's doubles

Mixed doubles

  BWF Grand Prix Gold tournament
  BWF Grand Prix tournament

BWF International Challenge/Series 
Men's doubles

Mixed doubles

  BWF International Challenge tournament
  BWF International Series tournament
  BWF Future Series tournament

References

External links 
 Rio 2016

1991 births
Living people
Sportspeople from Haarlem
Dutch male badminton players
Badminton players at the 2016 Summer Olympics
Olympic badminton players of the Netherlands
20th-century Dutch people
21st-century Dutch people